Float Railway Station was a former station on the Inny Junction to Cavan branch of the Midland Great Western Railway, Ireland. It opened in 1856 and closed in 1947. Due to the fuel shortage caused by World War Two, the station was closed for over a year and a half in 1944–1945.

References 

http://eiretrains.com/Photo_Gallery/Railway%20Stations%20F/Float/IrishRailwayStations.html
Ordnance Survey of Ireland 1: 50,000 Discovery Series map no. 41 shows the station locale.

List: F
Railway stations opened in 1856